I, Strahd is a 1993 fantasy horror novel by P. N. Elrod, set in the world of Ravenloft, and based on the Dungeons & Dragons game.

Plot summary
In I, Strahd: The Memoirs of a Vampire, army commander Strahd Von Zarovich takes up residence in Ravenloft and then, consumed by envy and regret for lost youth, succumbs to the temptations of the black arts.

I, Strahd tells the story of count Strahd Von Zarovich, and how he conquered the realm of Barovia, and how he became a vampire to win the love of his brother's fiancée, Tatyana.

Reception
A reviewer from Publishers Weekly called the book "a chilling, dark fantasy" and comments: "While this volume follows Vampire of the Mists (by Christie Golden) and Knight of the Black Rose (by James Lowder), the narrative's events seem to pre-date those of Golden's story. Although certain events and characters are depicted differently in all three novels, this is not a failing, necessarily, if readers keep in mind that this book is part of TSR's Dungeons & Dragons gaming world, in which each session at the gameboard produces varying scenarios. Elrod's strong prose and excellent pacing are not diminished by being confined to the boundaries of a pre-established universe. Though this novel lacks the baroque sensuality of Anne Rice's Interview with the Vampire or the streetwise humor of the author's own The Vampire Files, it is an exciting and original vampire tale."

Gideon Kibblewhite reviewed I, Strahd: The Memoirs of a Vampire for Arcane magazine, rating it an 8 out of 10 overall. He comments: "Brooding and eerie, punctuated by dreamlike bursts of violence, I Strahd is a full-bodied tale of unrequited love and insanity." He stated that "The story, at first simmering with menace, boils over into a surreal blood-bath as we follow him into the shadows." Kibblewhite continues: "The memoirs of a vampire... it's not a new idea, but this one is done so well. It allows us to fly with him and the bats, to run with the wolves, and to sleep in the tomb. Obviously at home with her subject, Elrod describes, with an uncanny touch for time and place, the ecstasy and horror of an eternal half-life." He adds: "And in Strahd she has created a compelling figure. Intimately painted are his dusty sense of humour, his remote sense of honour, and his castle. He is as poisonous as the fog bordering his lands."  Kibblewhite concludes his review by considering the novel "Beautifully written, dark, and tragic; and thoroughly recommended to vampire hunters everywhere."

Reviews
Review by Don D'Ammassa (1993) in Science Fiction Chronicle, #165 August 1993
Review by Scott Winnett (1993) in Locus, #393 October 1993
Backstab #6

References

1993 American novels
Ravenloft novels